The 1946 Western Ontario Mustangs football team represented the University of Western Ontario in the Intercollegiate Union during the 1946 college football season. Led by head coach Johnny Metras, the Mustangs compiled a 7–1 record and outscored opponent by a total of 214 to 64.

Prior to the season, the Mustangs had been undefeated in college football since 1938. The undefeated streak ended with the opening game against Canisius.

Schedule

References

Western Ontario
Western Mustangs football seasons
Western Ontario Mustangs footbal